{{DISPLAYTITLE:C3H5NO}}
The molecular formula C3H5NO (molar mass: 71.08 g/mol, exact mass: 71.0371 u) may refer to:

 Acrylamide (repeating unit in polyacrylamide)
 2-Azetidinone
 Isoxazoline
 Lactonitrile
 Oxazoline